Sidney John Wilson (22 September 1858 – 1 February 1917) was an English first-class cricketer, broker and British Army officer.

The son of the cricketer and barrister Alfred Wilson, he was born in September 1858 at Paddington. He was educated at Winchester College. Wilson made a single appearance in first-class cricket for the Marylebone Cricket Club (MCC) against Somerset at Lord's in 1882. He batted twice in the match, making 6 runs in the MCC first innings before being dismissed by Charles Winter, while in their second innings he was dismissed for 2 runs by Arnold Fothergill. He also bowled two wicketless overs with his right-arm medium pace bowling. Wilson served as a volunteer in the Queen's Own Royal West Kent Regiment, holding the rank of captain in April 1885. By profession he was a colonial produce broker at Mincing Lane in City of London. He died in February 1917 at Flushing, Cornwall.

References

External links

1858 births
1917 deaths
People from Paddington
People educated at Winchester College
Queen's Own Royal West Kent Regiment officers
English cricketers
Marylebone Cricket Club cricketers